Un moment d'égarement may refer to:

 Un moment d'égarement (1977 film), directed by Claude Berri
 Un moment d'égarement (2015 film), directed by Jean-François Richet